Cooperstown is an unincorporated community in Brown County, Illinois, United States. It is located east of Mount Sterling and southeast of Ripley. 

William H. Dieterich, member of the Illinois House of Representatives, U.S. Representative from Illinois, and U.S. Senator from Illinois, was born near Cooperstown.

References

Unincorporated communities in Brown County, Illinois
Unincorporated communities in Illinois